A draw plate is type of die consisting of a hardened steel plate with one or more holes through which wire is drawn to make it thinner. A typical plate will have twenty to thirty holes so a wide range of diameters can be drawn.

With a mandrel, a draw plate can be used to draw tubes of metal. Plates are available in many different sizes and shapes for drawing different shapes of wire, including round, square, oval, half-round and hexagonal.  The plate has rows of holes drilled through it which are slightly wider at the back.

Drawing wire

When drawing, the plate is held securely in a vise or other fixture. Annealed wire is filed at one end to give it an initial taper.  The tapered end is inserted into a hole with a final diameter just smaller than its current width.  Special pliers, called draw tongs are used to hold the tip of the wire and pull it through, sometimes with the aid of grease or wax as a lubricant. Small diameter wire may be drawn manually, while very thick wire may require a drawing bench with a crank. Often, a wire can be drawn three times in a row before it needs to be re-annealed. This must be done because drawing wire hardens it, which causes the wire to become brittle.  Brittle wire that has not been annealed may snap during the drawing process (or develop microscopic or macroscopic cracks, which may weaken the piece or "grow" with further working).

Draw plates reduce the thickness of wire by reshaping the metal; increasing length while decreasing diameter. As such, a piece of wire will become considerably lengthened during the drawing process.

See also
Tube drawing
Cold working
Die (manufacturing)

References

Jewellery making
Metal forming